Elysian Park Fault is an active blind thrust fault located in Central Los Angeles, California.  Approximately 20 km (12.4 miles) long, the fault is believed to able to produce a destructive earthquake of magnitude 6.2–6.7, about every 500–1,300 years, similar in size and frequency to the 1971 San Fernando earthquake or 1994 Northridge earthquake.

See also
 Elysian Park, Los Angeles

References

Seismic faults of California
Strike-slip faults
Chino Hills (California)
Geology of Riverside County, California
Geology of San Bernardino County, California
Geography of Corona, California
Buried rupture earthquakes